Petr Fuksa (born 28 September 1969 in Nymburk) is a Czech sprint and marathon canoeist who competed from 1996 to 2006. He won eleven medals at the ICF Canoe Sprint World Championships with two golds (C-4 200 m: 1998, 2006), seven silvers (C-2 200 m: 2002, 2003; C-4 200 m: 1999, 2001, 2002, 2003, 2005), and two bronze (C-2 200 m: 1997); C-4 200 m: 1997.

Fuksa also competed at the 1996 Summer Olympics in Atlanta, but was eliminated in the semifinal rounds in both the C-2 500 m and C-2 1000 m events. His son Martin Fuksa is a world class canoeist as well, winning the C-1 500m at Moscow 2016 and competing at the Rio Olympic games.

Personal life
Fuksa is the father of Olympic canoeists Martin and Petr Fuksa Jr.

References

Sports-reference.com profile

1969 births
Canoeists at the 1996 Summer Olympics
Czech male canoeists
Living people
Olympic canoeists of the Czech Republic
ICF Canoe Sprint World Championships medalists in Canadian
People from Nymburk
Sportspeople from the Central Bohemian Region